Shawn Rojeski (born January 21, 1972) is an American curler from Chisholm, Minnesota and Olympic medalist. He was born and raised in Biwabik, Minnesota and attended Mesabi East High School. Under skip Pete Fenson, he received a bronze medal at the 2006 Winter Olympics in Torino, playing as the third. The team was later named the 2006 USOC Team of the Year.

He participated on the American team at the 1998, 2003, 2005, 2006 2010, 2011 and 2014 World Curling Championships.

After participating at the 2010 Worlds and finishing in fourth place, he and the rest of the Fenson rink teamed up with Ryan Brunt and went to the 2011 Continental Cup of Curling, where Team North America defeated Team World. He then went to the 2011 US Nationals, where, after remaining undefeated in the round robin, the Fenson rink won the gold medal at the nationals. They represented the United States at the 2011 Ford World Men's Curling Championship in April at Regina, Saskatchewan, finishing with a 3–8 win–loss record at 10th after a series of close losses.

Teams

References

External links

 

1972 births
Living people
American male curlers
People from Virginia, Minnesota
Olympic curlers of the United States
Curlers at the 2006 Winter Olympics
Olympic bronze medalists for the United States in curling
Medalists at the 2006 Winter Olympics
Continental Cup of Curling participants
American curling champions